Arumugam is a 2009 Indian Tamil-language masala film directed by Suresh Krishna and written by Rashid Premji. The film stars Bharath and Priyamani, while Ramya Krishnan, Saranya Mohan, Sathya, and Karunas, among others, play supporting roles. The music was composed by Deva. The film released on 25 September 2009 and was panned by critics as well as audience. This movie was based on Rajinikanth starred movie Annaamalai, which was released on 1992.

Synopsis
Arumugam (Bharath) is a Good Samaritan who makes a living selling idlis on a roadside platform shop along with his father (Ilavarasu), sister Mallika (Saranya Mohan) and sidekick (Karunas). Arumugam is in love with his childhood sweetheart Yamini (Priyamani) His best friend is the rich kid Karthik (Sathya), whose sister is an arrogant tycoon Malini Devi (Ramya Krishnan). She and her uncle (Mahadevan) hates Karthik's deep bonding with Arumugam, who she finds to be below her stature. Malini, through her machinations, is able to separate the friends and bring Arumugam to the streets. Arumugam, after his mother's (Seetha) grave is bulldozed and Mallika is humiliated, vows to bring Malini to the streets. Due to his hard work and smart moves, he becomes the richest man in the town and takes his revenge.

Cast
Bharath as Arumugam
Priyamani as Yamini
Ramya Krishnan as Malini Devi
Saranya Mohan as Mallika (Arumugam's sister)
Sathya as Karthik (Arumugam's friend and Malini's brother)
 Sara Alambara as Karthik's wife
 Karunas as Arumugam's sidekick
 Ilavarasu as Arumugam's father
Seetha as Arumugam's mother
Pithamagan Mahadevan as Malini's uncle
Mayilsamy  as O. C. Idly Customer
Abhinay as Karthik's lawyer
Manobala

Soundtrack
Soundtrack was composed by Deva and lyrics were written by Pa. Vijay and Perarasu.

Reception
The film received negative reviews from critics who compared it with director's own film Annamalai due to its similar plot. Sify labelled the film as "poor" cited that the film "makes you feel suffocated and every scene is predictable". Pavithra Srinivasan from Rediff labelled the film as a "ridiculous fare", giving it merely 0.5 out of 5 stars. Behinwoods wrote calling it "outdated story taken in a manner that would have worked in the mid 90s".

References

External links

 

2009 films
Films directed by Suresh Krissna
Films scored by Deva (composer)
2000s Tamil-language films

2000s masala films